The 4th constituency of the Pyrénées-Orientales (French: Quatrième circonscription des Pyrénées-Orientales) is a French legislative constituency in the Pyrénées-Orientales département. Like the other 576 French constituencies, it elects one MP using the two-round system, with a run-off if no candidate receives over 50% of the vote in the first round.

Description

The 4th constituency of Pyrénées-Orientales stretches lies in the south east of the department along the border with Spain.

The seat has generally leaned to the left with a sole conservative victory in 2007 being the exception. In common with other seats in Pyrénées-Orientales 2017 saw a strong performance by the National Front.

Assembly Members

Election results

2022

 
 
 
 
 
 
 
|-
| colspan="8" bgcolor="#E9E9E9"|
|-
 
 

 
 
 
 
 * PS dissident

2017

|- style="background-color:#E9E9E9;text-align:center;"
! colspan="2" rowspan="2" style="text-align:left;" | Candidate
! rowspan="2" colspan="2" style="text-align:left;" | Party
! colspan="2" | 1st round
! colspan="2" | 2nd round
|- style="background-color:#E9E9E9;text-align:center;"
! width="75" | Votes
! width="30" | %
! width="75" | Votes
! width="30" | %
|-
| style="background-color:" |
| style="text-align:left;" | Sébastien Cazenove
| style="text-align:left;" | La République En Marche!
| LREM
| 
| 29.00
| 
| 57.97
|-
| style="background-color:" |
| style="text-align:left;" | Stéphane Massanell
| style="text-align:left;" | National Front
| FN
| 
| 20.02
| 
| 42.03
|-
| style="background-color:" |
| style="text-align:left;" | Jacqueline Irles
| style="text-align:left;" | The Republicans
| LR
| 
| 15.37
| colspan="2" style="text-align:left;" |
|-
| style="background-color:" |
| style="text-align:left;" | Dominique Guérin
| style="text-align:left;" | La France Insoumise
| FI
| 
| 10.72
| colspan="2" style="text-align:left;" |
|-
| style="background-color:" |
| style="text-align:left;" | Nicolas Garcia
| style="text-align:left;" | Communist Party
| PCF
| 
| 7.64
| colspan="2" style="text-align:left;" |
|-
| style="background-color:" |
| style="text-align:left;" | Alexandre Reynal
| style="text-align:left;" | Socialist Party
| PS
| 
| 7.51
| colspan="2" style="text-align:left;" |
|-
| style="background-color:" |
| style="text-align:left;" | Jordi Vera
| style="text-align:left;" | Regionalist
| REG
| 
| 3.91
| colspan="2" style="text-align:left;" |
|-
| style="background-color:" |
| style="text-align:left;" | Franck Huette
| style="text-align:left;" | Ecologist
| ECO
| 
| 2.42
| colspan="2" style="text-align:left;" |
|-
| style="background-color:" |
| style="text-align:left;" | Gisèle Mouragues
| style="text-align:left;" | Debout la France
| DLF
| 
| 0.92
| colspan="2" style="text-align:left;" |
|-
| style="background-color:" |
| style="text-align:left;" | Daniel Aillaud
| style="text-align:left;" | Independent
| DIV
| 
| 0.90
| colspan="2" style="text-align:left;" |
|-
| style="background-color:" |
| style="text-align:left;" | Esther Silan
| style="text-align:left;" | Far Left
| EXG
| 
| 0.72
| colspan="2" style="text-align:left;" |
|-
| style="background-color:" |
| style="text-align:left;" | Carole Percy
| style="text-align:left;" | Independent
| DIV
| 
| 0.51
| colspan="2" style="text-align:left;" |
|-
| style="background-color:" |
| style="text-align:left;" | Michèle Vadureau Perez
| style="text-align:left;" | Miscellaneous Right
| DVD
| 
| 0.36
| colspan="2" style="text-align:left;" |
|-
| colspan="8" style="background-color:#E9E9E9;"|
|- style="font-weight:bold"
| colspan="4" style="text-align:left;" | Total
| 
| 100%
| 
| 100%
|-
| colspan="8" style="background-color:#E9E9E9;"|
|-
| colspan="4" style="text-align:left;" | Registered voters
| 
| style="background-color:#E9E9E9;"|
| 
| style="background-color:#E9E9E9;"|
|-
| colspan="4" style="text-align:left;" | Blank/Void ballots
| 
| 2.69%
| 
| 11.73%
|-
| colspan="4" style="text-align:left;" | Turnout
| 
| 50.47%
| 
| 44.67%
|-
| colspan="4" style="text-align:left;" | Abstentions
| 
| 49.53%
| 
| 55.33%
|-
| colspan="8" style="background-color:#E9E9E9;"|
|- style="font-weight:bold"
| colspan="6" style="text-align:left;" | Result
| colspan="2" style="background-color:" | REM GAIN FROM PS
|}

2012

|- style="background-color:#E9E9E9;text-align:center;"
! colspan="2" rowspan="2" style="text-align:left;" | Candidate
! rowspan="2" colspan="2" style="text-align:left;" | Party
! colspan="2" | 1st round
! colspan="2" | 2nd round
|- style="background-color:#E9E9E9;text-align:center;"
! width="75" | Votes
! width="30" | %
! width="75" | Votes
! width="30" | %
|-
| style="background-color:" |
| style="text-align:left;" | Pierre Aylagas
| style="text-align:left;" | Socialist Party
| PS
| 
| 35.98
| 
| 55.42
|-
| style="background-color:" |
| style="text-align:left;" | Jacqueline Irles
| style="text-align:left;" | Union for a Presidential Majority
| UMP
| 
| 27.16
| 
| 44.58
|-
| style="background-color:" |
| style="text-align:left;" | Marie-Thérèse Costa-Fesenbeck
| style="text-align:left;" | National Front
| FN
| 
| 18.35
| colspan="2" style="text-align:left;" |
|-
| style="background-color:" |
| style="text-align:left;" | Nicolas Garcia
| style="text-align:left;" | Left Front
| FG
| 
| 12.55
| colspan="2" style="text-align:left;" |
|-
| style="background-color:" |
| style="text-align:left;" | Bruno Rouane
| style="text-align:left;" | Europe Ecology – The Greens
| EELV
| 
| 2.54
| colspan="2" style="text-align:left;" |
|-
| style="background-color:" |
| style="text-align:left;" | Yves Castanet
| style="text-align:left;" | Ecologist
| ECO
| 
| 0.92
| colspan="2" style="text-align:left;" |
|-
| style="background-color:" |
| style="text-align:left;" | Jean-Michel Serve
| style="text-align:left;" | Miscellaneous Right
| DVD
| 
| 0.60
| colspan="2" style="text-align:left;" |
|-
| style="background-color:" |
| style="text-align:left;" | Carol Malortigue
| style="text-align:left;" | Ecologist
| ECO
| 
| 0.52
| colspan="2" style="text-align:left;" |
|-
| style="background-color:" |
| style="text-align:left;" | Monique Jaulin
| style="text-align:left;" | Ecologist
| ECO
| 
| 0.47
| colspan="2" style="text-align:left;" |
|-
| style="background-color:" |
| style="text-align:left;" | Jean Boucher
| style="text-align:left;" | Far Left
| EXG
| 
| 0.36
| colspan="2" style="text-align:left;" |
|-
| style="background-color:" |
| style="text-align:left;" | Esther Silan
| style="text-align:left;" | Far Left
| EXG
| 
| 0.34
| colspan="2" style="text-align:left;" |
|-
| style="background-color:" |
| style="text-align:left;" | Natacha Bordez
| style="text-align:left;" | Other
| AUT
| 
| 0.20
| colspan="2" style="text-align:left;" |
|-
| colspan="8" style="background-color:#E9E9E9;"|
|- style="font-weight:bold"
| colspan="4" style="text-align:left;" | Total
| 
| 100%
| 
| 100%
|-
| colspan="8" style="background-color:#E9E9E9;"|
|-
| colspan="4" style="text-align:left;" | Registered voters
| 
| style="background-color:#E9E9E9;"|
| 
| style="background-color:#E9E9E9;"|
|-
| colspan="4" style="text-align:left;" | Blank/Void ballots
| 
| 1.72%
| 
| 5.01%
|-
| colspan="4" style="text-align:left;" | Turnout
| 
| 62.66%
| 
| 61.73%
|-
| colspan="4" style="text-align:left;" | Abstentions
| 
| 37.34%
| 
| 38.27%
|-
| colspan="8" style="background-color:#E9E9E9;"|
|- style="font-weight:bold"
| colspan="6" style="text-align:left;" | Result
| colspan="2" style="background-color:" | PS GAIN FROM UMP
|}

2007

|- style="background-color:#E9E9E9;text-align:center;"
! colspan="2" rowspan="2" style="text-align:left;" | Candidate
! rowspan="2" colspan="2" style="text-align:left;" | Party
! colspan="2" | 1st round
! colspan="2" | 2nd round
|- style="background-color:#E9E9E9;text-align:center;"
! width="75" | Votes
! width="30" | %
! width="75" | Votes
! width="30" | %
|-
| style="background-color:" |
| style="text-align:left;" | Jacqueline Irles
| style="text-align:left;" | Union for a Popular Movement
| UMP
| 
| 37.59
| 
| 50.25
|-
| style="background-color:" |
| style="text-align:left;" | Pierre Aylagas
| style="text-align:left;" | Miscellaneous Left
| DVG
| 
| 17.92
| 
| 49.75
|-
| style="background-color:" |
| style="text-align:left;" | Olivier Ferrand
| style="text-align:left;" | Socialist Party
| PS
| 
| 15.25
| colspan="2" style="text-align:left;" |
|-
| style="background-color:" |
| style="text-align:left;" | Nicolas Garcia
| style="text-align:left;" | Communist Party
| PCF
| 
| 9.47
| colspan="2" style="text-align:left;" |
|-
| style="background-color:" |
| style="text-align:left;" | Yves Porteix
| style="text-align:left;" | UDF-Democratic Movement
| UDF-MoDem
| 
| 5.36
| colspan="2" style="text-align:left;" |
|-
| style="background-color:" |
| style="text-align:left;" | Marie-Therese Costa-Fesenbeck
| style="text-align:left;" | National Front
| FN
| 
| 4.57
| colspan="2" style="text-align:left;" |
|-
| style="background-color:" |
| style="text-align:left;" | Myriam Granat
| style="text-align:left;" | Miscellaneous Right
| DVD
| 
| 2.22
| colspan="2" style="text-align:left;" |
|-
| style="background-color:" |
| style="text-align:left;" | Franck Huette
| style="text-align:left;" | The Greens
| LV
| 
| 1.61
| colspan="2" style="text-align:left;" |
|-
| style="background-color:" |
| style="text-align:left;" | Yannick Fissier
| style="text-align:left;" | Far Left
| EXG
| 
| 1.48
| colspan="2" style="text-align:left;" |
|-
| style="background-color:" |
| style="text-align:left;" | Nicole Puigbo
| style="text-align:left;" | Hunting, Fishing, Nature and Traditions
| CPNT
| 
| 1.13
| colspan="2" style="text-align:left;" |
|-
| style="background-color:" |
| style="text-align:left;" | Françoise Tibau
| style="text-align:left;" | Regionalist
| REG
| 
| 0.97
| colspan="2" style="text-align:left;" |
|-
| style="background-color:" |
| style="text-align:left;" | Jacques Cros
| style="text-align:left;" | Ecologist
| ECO
| 
| 0.84
| colspan="2" style="text-align:left;" |
|-
| style="background-color:" |
| style="text-align:left;" | Jacques Menechal
| style="text-align:left;" | Movement for France
| MPF
| 
| 0.64
| colspan="2" style="text-align:left;" |
|-
| style="background-color:" |
| style="text-align:left;" | Maria Hernandez
| style="text-align:left;" | Independent
| DIV
| 
| 0.50
| colspan="2" style="text-align:left;" |
|-
| style="background-color:" |
| style="text-align:left;" | Esther Silan
| style="text-align:left;" | Far Left
| EXG
| 
| 0.45
| colspan="2" style="text-align:left;" |
|-
| colspan="8" style="background-color:#E9E9E9;"|
|- style="font-weight:bold"
| colspan="4" style="text-align:left;" | Total
| 
| 100%
| 
| 100%
|-
| colspan="8" style="background-color:#E9E9E9;"|
|-
| colspan="4" style="text-align:left;" | Registered voters
| 
| style="background-color:#E9E9E9;"|
| 
| style="background-color:#E9E9E9;"|
|-
| colspan="4" style="text-align:left;" | Blank/Void ballots
| 
| 1.84%
| 
| 4.12%
|-
| colspan="4" style="text-align:left;" | Turnout
| 
| 65.28%
| 
| 66.68%
|-
| colspan="4" style="text-align:left;" | Abstentions
| 
| 34.72%
| 
| 33.32%
|-
| colspan="8" style="background-color:#E9E9E9;"|
|- style="font-weight:bold"
| colspan="6" style="text-align:left;" | Result
| colspan="2" style="background-color:" | UMP GAIN FROM PS
|}

2002

|- style="background-color:#E9E9E9;text-align:center;"
! colspan="2" rowspan="2" style="text-align:left;" | Candidate
! rowspan="2" colspan="2" style="text-align:left;" | Party
! colspan="2" | 1st round
! colspan="2" | 2nd round
|- style="background-color:#E9E9E9;text-align:center;"
! width="75" | Votes
! width="30" | %
! width="75" | Votes
! width="30" | %
|-
| style="background-color:" |
| style="text-align:left;" | Henri Sicre
| style="text-align:left;" | Socialist Party
| PS
| 
| 31.09
| 
| 51.58
|-
| style="background-color:" |
| style="text-align:left;" | Myriam Granat
| style="text-align:left;" | Union for a Presidential Majority
| UMP
| 
| 27.69
| 
| 48.42
|-
| style="background-color:" |
| style="text-align:left;" | Edouard Fesenbeck
| style="text-align:left;" | National Front
| FN
| 
| 16.30
| colspan="2" style="text-align:left;" |
|-
| style="background-color:" |
| style="text-align:left;" | Nicolas Garcia
| style="text-align:left;" | Communist Party
| PCF
| 
| 8.77
| colspan="2" style="text-align:left;" |
|-
| style="background-color:" |
| style="text-align:left;" | Catherine Delhoste
| style="text-align:left;" | Hunting, Fishing, Nature and Traditions
| CPNT
| 
| 2.63
| colspan="2" style="text-align:left;" |
|-
| style="background-color:" |
| style="text-align:left;" | Annick Duval
| style="text-align:left;" | The Greens
| LV
| 
| 2.51
| colspan="2" style="text-align:left;" |
|-
| style="background-color:" |
| style="text-align:left;" | Virginie Barre
| style="text-align:left;" | Regionalist
| REG
| 
| 1.92
| colspan="2" style="text-align:left;" |
|-
| style="background-color:" |
| style="text-align:left;" | Sebastine Lefevre
| style="text-align:left;" | Revolutionary Communist League
| LCR
| 
| 1.51
| colspan="2" style="text-align:left;" |
|-
| style="background-color:" |
| style="text-align:left;" | Chantal Decosse
| style="text-align:left;" | Republican Pole
| PR
| 
| 1.47
| colspan="2" style="text-align:left;" |
|-
| style="background-color:" |
| style="text-align:left;" | Christiane Bruneau
| style="text-align:left;" | Movement for France
| MPF
| 
| 1.45
| colspan="2" style="text-align:left;" |
|-
| style="background-color:" |
| style="text-align:left;" | Annette Delcroix
| style="text-align:left;" | Independent
| DIV
| 
| 1.14
| colspan="2" style="text-align:left;" |
|-
| style="background-color:" |
| style="text-align:left;" | Jose Marin
| style="text-align:left;" | National Republican Movement
| MNR
| 
| 1.05
| colspan="2" style="text-align:left;" |
|-
| style="background-color:" |
| style="text-align:left;" | J. Marie Benito
| style="text-align:left;" | Workers' Struggle
| LO
| 
| 1.04
| colspan="2" style="text-align:left;" |
|-
| style="background-color:" |
| style="text-align:left;" | CANDIDATE
| style="text-align:left;" | Edwige Pia
| ECO
| 
| 0.95
| colspan="2" style="text-align:left;" |
|-
| style="background-color:" |
| style="text-align:left;" | Martine Lebrun
| style="text-align:left;" | Ecologist
| ECO
| 
| 0.37
| colspan="2" style="text-align:left;" |
|-
| style="background-color:" |
| style="text-align:left;" | Christian Joubert
| style="text-align:left;" | Independent
| DIV
| 
| 0.12
| colspan="2" style="text-align:left;" |
|-
| colspan="8" style="background-color:#E9E9E9;"|
|- style="font-weight:bold"
| colspan="4" style="text-align:left;" | Total
| 
| 100%
| 
| 100%
|-
| colspan="8" style="background-color:#E9E9E9;"|
|-
| colspan="4" style="text-align:left;" | Registered voters
| 
| style="background-color:#E9E9E9;"|
| 
| style="background-color:#E9E9E9;"|
|-
| colspan="4" style="text-align:left;" | Blank/Void ballots
| 
| 2.69%
| 
| 6.04%
|-
| colspan="4" style="text-align:left;" | Turnout
| 
| 66.44%
| 
| 63.87%
|-
| colspan="4" style="text-align:left;" | Abstentions
| 
| 33.56%
| 
| 36.13%
|-
| colspan="8" style="background-color:#E9E9E9;"|
|- style="font-weight:bold"
| colspan="6" style="text-align:left;" | Result
| colspan="2" style="background-color:" | PS HOLD
|}

References

4